Falcon Field  is in an airport located in Maricopa County, Arizona. However, it is now within city limits. The National Plan of Integrated Airport Systems for 2017–2021 categorized it as a reliever airport. Scheduled service to Bullhead City on Western Express Air ended in January 2007.

Most U.S. airports use the same three-letter location identifier for the FAA and IATA, but Falcon Field is FFZ to the FAA and MSC to the IATA.

Adjacent Boeing heliport 
The Boeing Company operates a heliport  and factory adjacent to Falcon Field, known as the Boeing Mesa Facility. Boeing uses the facility to manufacture and maintain the AH-64 Apache military helicopter.

Other services 
Local companies:
Alliant Techsystems (ATK)
Boeing
CAE Global Academy Phoenix
Falcon Executive Aviation Inc.
Lockheed Martin
Marsh Aviation
MD Helicopters
Nammo Talley
Semflex
Special Devices Inc.
Timken
Trans-Matic
Wal-Mart
GECO Inc.

Local groups:
 Falcon Field Area Alliance (FFAA)
 Falcon Field Tenants & Users Association
 Civil Air Patrol - Falcon Composite Squadron 305
Mesa Police Department - Air Support Unit

Local museums:
 Arizona Commemorative Air Force Museum

Education:
 A campus of the Sabena Flight Academy is located on the airfield.

History 

Falcon Field got its start before World War II when Hollywood producer Leland Hayward and pilot John H. "Jack" Connelly founded Southwest Airways with funding from friends including Henry Fonda, Fred Astaire, Ginger Rogers, James Stewart, and Hoagy Carmichael. Southwest Airways operated two other airfields in Arizona -- Thunderbird Field No. 1 (now the site of Arizona Christian University) and Thunderbird Field No. 2 (now the site of Scottsdale Airport) -- to train pilots from China, Russia and 24 other Allied nations. Falcon was to be Thunderbird Field III and would train British pilots.

However, the British said they would like the field to be named after one of their birds, and thus Falcon Field opened as the No. 4 British Flying Training School (BFTS). There were six BFTS airfields in the U.S., in Florida, Oklahoma, Texas, California and Arizona.

The groundbreaking ceremony for Falcon Field was held at 10:30am on July 16, 1941. Mesa, Arizona mayor, George Nicholas Goodman, and Arizona governor, Sidney P. Osbone, dug the first shovels of dirt.

In September 1941 the first cadets of the Royal Air Force arrived. They trained in Stearman PT-17s and North American Aviation AT-6s.  The good weather, wide-open desert terrain, and lack of enemy airpower provided safer and more efficient training than was possible in England. Even so, twenty-three British cadets, one American cadet and four instructors were killed and are now buried in the Mesa City Cemetery, along with several colleagues who have since died of natural causes. Several thousand pilots were trained there until the RAF installation was closed at the end of the war. The City of Mesa purchased the field from the U.S. government for $1.

From 1945 to 1965 the field was leased out to industrial interests, including Talley Defense Systems, Astro Rocket Inc., Rocket Power Inc., the Gabriel Company and others.

Eventually it became a civil airfield, and is now owned and operated by the city of Mesa. Falcon Field is the home of CAE Oxford Aviation Academy, the largest flight school in the world. Student pilots from Japan, Belgium, The Netherlands, the UK, Italy, Turkey, Mexico and Vietnam fly out of Falcon Field.  Since 1976 Falcon Field has been the home of Airbase Arizona, one of the largest units in the Commemorative Air Force (CAF) which operates a flying B-17G "Sentimental Journey" and a B-25J "Maid in the Shade" among other aircraft. On May 19, 2016, the Falcon Field World War II Aviation Hangars were listed in the National Register of Historic Places, reference #16000266.

In popular culture 
Several scenes of the 1980 aerobatics film Cloud Dancer were filmed at this airport.

See also 
 36th Flying Training Wing (World War II)
 Arizona World War II Army Airfields
Arizona Commemorative Air Force Museum
 List of airports in Arizona

Notes

References 

 
 Bustrin, Mary Louise. My Second Job. Mesa, AZ: Mary Louise Bustrin, 1990.
 Dawson, Jim. The RAF in Arizona: Falcon Field, 1941–1945. Newnan, GA: Stenger-Scott Publishing, 2002.
 Mallett, Daryl F. Falcon Field. Charleston, SC: Arcadia Publishing, 2009.
 Manning, Thomas A. (2005), History of Air Education and Training Command, 1942–2002.  Office of History and Research, Headquarters, AETC, Randolph AFB, Texas  
 Shaw, Frederick J. (2004), Locating Air Force Base Sites, History’s Legacy, Air Force History and Museums Program, United States Air Force, Washington DC. 
 Simmons, Larry J. The Falcon Field Story. Scottsdale, AZ: Larry J. Simmons, 2002.

External links

 Falcon Field Airport
 Mesa ~ Falcon Field (FFZ) at Arizona DOT airport directory
 Falcon Field at VisitingPHX.com website
 Tango One Aviation, the fixed-base operator (FBO)
 Aerial image as of July 1992 from USGS The National Map
 
 
 

Airports in Maricopa County, Arizona
Buildings and structures in Mesa, Arizona
Transportation in Mesa, Arizona
1942 establishments in Arizona
Airfields of the United States Army Air Forces in Arizona
USAAF Contract Flying School Airfields
Airports established in 1942